Ganzi may refer to:

Ganzi, Gabon, town in Gabon
Ganzi, South Sudan, village/town in South Sudan
Ganzi Tibetan Autonomous Prefecture, prefecture in Sichuan, China
Ganzi County, county in Garzê Tibetan Autonomous Prefecture
Garzê Town, a town in the Garzê Tibetan Autonomous Prefecture
Marc Ganzi, an American businessman and polo player.
Ganzi, a song by Jae the Kid.